Crónica del Cid may refer to:

Crónica rimada del Cid ( 1360),  cantar de gesta of El Cid 
Crónica popular del Cid (1498), biography of El Cid
Crónica particular del Cid (1512), biography of El Cid